El Cañaveral is an administrative neighborhood of Madrid, belonging to the district of Vicálvaro. The first neighbors of the PAU installed in 2016. As of 1 March 2020, the neighborhood has a population of 2,565.

Once the PAU is fully built it is expected to feature 14,000 housing units. In addition, Los Cerros is tentatively expected to feature 15,000 housing units.

The neighborhood is roughly delimitated by the C-2/C-7 commuter railroads, the R-3, and the municipal borders with Rivas-Vaciamadrid, San Fernando de Henares and Coslada.

References 
Informational notes

Citations

Vicálvaro
Wards of Madrid